Cooke is a surname.

Cooke may also refer to:

 Cooke County, Texas
 Cooke City, Montana
 Cooke Township, Cumberland County, Pennsylvania
 Cooke Optics, a lens manufacturer
 Cooke triplet, an influential early lens design
 Cooke Locomotive and Machine Works, steam railroad locomotive manufacturer, founded in 1852
 , a British frigate in service in the Royal Navy from 1943 to 1946
 Cooke's method, a forecasting method with an expert panel, similar to the Delphi method

See also
 Cook (disambiguation)